The R619 road is a regional road in Ireland which runs north-south from the N73 in Mallow to Farnanes on the N22 between Macroom and Cork City. It crosses the River Lee south of Coachford.

The R619 is entirely in County Cork.

Regional roads in the Republic of Ireland
Roads in County Cork